Ankara Atatürk Sport Hall is an indoor sport arena located in the district of Ulus in Ankara, Turkey. The hall with a seating capacity for 4,500 people and a parking lot for 500 cars was built in 1969.

Home of the clubs Büyük Kolej and Türk Telekom, it is the second biggest indoor sport hall in Ankara after ASKI Sport Hall, where competitions of basketball, volleyball and handball are held.

Following the preliminary round, which took place in Bursa and İzmir, Atatürk Sport Hall hosted 16.

References
 Ankara Atatürk Sport Hall 

Ataturk Sport Hall
Indoor arenas in Turkey
Basketball venues in Turkey
Altındağ, Ankara
Things named after Mustafa Kemal Atatürk